Calas is a surname. Notable people with the surname include:

Jean Calas (1698–1762), Protestant executed for his faith
Georges Calas (born 1948), French mineralogist
Nicolas Calas (1907–1988), Greek-American poet and art critic
Raoul Calas (1899–1978), French politician

See also 

 Chalas (surname)